A stimulus is something that causes a physiological response. It may refer to:

Stimulation
Stimulus (physiology), something external that influences an activity
Stimulus (psychology), a concept in behaviorism and perception
Stimulus (economics)
For government spending as stimulus, see Fiscal policy
For an increase in money designed to speed growth, see Monetary policy
The input to an input/output system, especially in computers

See also 
Stimulus bill (disambiguation), in economics
Economic Stimulus Act of 2008, United States
2008 Chinese economic stimulus plan
2008 European Union stimulus plan
American Recovery and Reinvestment Act of 2009
Stimulus Package, an add-on for the video game ''Modern Warfare 2